Bailey's Cove (alternatively spelled Bayley's Cove) is a Canadian hamlet in the Bonavista district of the province of Newfoundland and Labrador.

The Bailey's Cove Church of England School, constructed  1880 to 1900, and its Municipal Heritage Building are both historic places on the Canadian Register of Historic Places.

See also
List of communities in Newfoundland and Labrador

References

Populated coastal places in Canada
Populated places in Newfoundland and Labrador